CFNQ-FM is a First Nations community radio station that operates at 89.1 MHz (FM) in Natashquan, Quebec, Canada.

The station is owned by Corporation de Radio montagnaise de Natashquan.

External links

Fnq
Fnq
Year of establishment missing
Innu culture